Sharmin Segal is an Indian actress who works in Hindi films. She started her career as an assistant director and made her acting debut with Malaal (2019), receiving Filmfare Award for Best Female Debut nomination. Segal has since starred in Atithi Bhooto Bhava (2022).

Early life and background
Segal was born in 1995 to Bela Segal and Deepak Segal in Mumbai, Maharashtra. While her mother is a film editor, who has Black to her credit, her father is a film producer. She is the granddaughter of Mohan Segal, an indian film director who introduced veteran actress Rekha to the industry.

Segal's maternal grandparents are film score composer D.O. Bhansali and Leela Bhansali. She is the niece of director-producer Sanjay Leela Bhansali. She completed her acting course from Lee Strasberg Theatre and Film Institute, New York.

Career

Segal started her career as an assistant director with Goliyon Ki Raasleela Ram-Leela (2013) and has assisted on films such as Mary Kom (2014), Bajirao Mastani (2015) and Gangubai Kathiawadi (2022).

Segal made her acting debut in 2019 with Sanjay Leela Bhansali's Malaal. She portrayed Astha Tripathi opposite Meezaan Jafri. It received mixed reviews from critics. The Times of India praised the performance of debutants Meezaan and Sharmin and their onscreen chemistry, termed it as a 'simmering love story' with 'romantic and intense moments'. News18, termed the debut duo of Meezaan and Sharmin Segal 'charming in parts', but 'rough around the edges'. She received Filmfare Award for Best Female Debut nomination for her performance.

In 2022, she portrayed an air hostess Netra Banerjee opposite Pratik Gandhi, in ZEE5's Atithi Bhooto Bhava. It received mixed reviews from critics. Filmfare wrote, "Sharmin looks convincing as the girl who has a hard time adjusting to her man's quirks. She and Pratik comes out as a real couple." DNA India termed Segal as 'outstanding' and said that the film will leave you emotional.

Segal will next appear in Bhansali's Netflix web series Heeramandi.

Personal life

In a 2019 interview, Segal opened up about being fat-shamed as a teenager. She mentioned that she was overweight as a teen and claimed that she was made fun of in school till she graduated. Talking about the current trend of promoting body positivity, she said that she was bullied for over 15 years and that she wasn’t confident.

Filmography

Films

Web series

Awards and nominations

See also
 List of Hindi film actresses

References

External links

1995 births
Living people
21st-century Indian actresses
Year of birth uncertain
Indian film actresses